Country Code: +247International Call Prefix: 00

Ascension Island does not share the same country code (+290) with the rest of St Helena.

Calling formats
To call in Ascension Island, the following format is used:

yxxxx      Calls inside Ascension Island

+247 yxxxx  Calls from outside Ascension Island

Ascension Island numbering plan
According to ITU Communication of 08.V.2015, Sure South Atlantic Limited, Jamestown, announced the following update to the numbering plan for Ascension.

The length of geographical numbers increased from four (4) to five (5) digits and prefixed with the number "6".

The 4XXXX range  reserved for mobile services.

The change to five-digit numbering to be implemented on 1 June 2015.   

1: New 5-digit numbering

2: 6-digit numbering

See also
Telephone numbers in the United Kingdom
Telephone numbers in Saint Helena and Tristan da Cunha

References

Additional References

Network Dictionary  Dong, J. 2007. pp548–549. Saratoga : Javvin Press

Ascension Island
Ascension Island